Kim Yong-ok (born ) is a North Korean weightlifter, who competed in the 63 kg category and represented North Korea at international competitions. 

She participated at the 2000 Summer Olympics in the 63 kg event. She competed at world championships, at the 1999 World Weightlifting Championships.

Major results

References

External links

1976 births
Living people
North Korean female weightlifters
Weightlifters at the 2000 Summer Olympics
Olympic weightlifters of North Korea
Place of birth missing (living people)